Societal and cultural aspects of autism or sociology of autism come into play with recognition of autism, approaches to its support services and therapies, and how autism affects the definition of personhood. The autistic community is divided primarily into two camps; the neurodiversity movement and the Pathology paradigm. The pathology paradigm advocates for supporting research into therapies, treatments, and/or a cure to help minimize or remove autistic traits, seeing treatment as vital to help individuals with autism, while the neurodiversity movement believes autism should be seen as a different way of being and advocates against a cure and interventions that focus on normalization (but do not oppose interventions that emphasize acceptance, adaptive skills building, or interventions that aim to reduce intrinsically harmful traits, behaviors, or conditions), seeing it as trying to exterminate autistic people and their individuality. Both are controversial in autism communities and advocacy which has led to significant infighting between these two camps. While the dominant paradigm is the pathology paradigm and is followed largely by autism research and scientific communities, the neurodiversity movement is highly popular among most autistic people, within autism advocacy, autism rights organizations, and related neurodiversity approaches have been rapidly growing and applied in the autism research field in the last few years.  

There are many autism-related events and celebrations; including World Autism Awareness Day, Autism Sunday and Autistic Pride Day, and notable people have spoken about being autistic or are thought to be or have been autistic. Autism is diagnosed more frequently in males than in females.

Terminology
Although some prefer to use the person-first terminology person with autism, other members of the autistic community prefer identity-first terminology, such as autistic person or autistic in formal English, to stress that autism is a part of their identity rather than a disease they have. In addition, phrases like  are objectionable to many people.

The autistic community has developed abbreviations for commonly used terms, such as:
 Aspie – a person with Asperger syndrome.
 Autie – an autistic person. It can be contrasted with aspie to refer to those specifically diagnosed with classic autism or another autism spectrum disorder.
 Autistics and Cousins (AC) – a cover term including aspies, auties, and their "cousins", i.e. people with some autistic traits but no formal diagnosis.
 Curebie – a person with the desire to cure autism. This term is highly derogatory.
 Neurodiversity – tolerance of people regardless of neurological makeup.
 Neurotypical (NT) – a person who does not have any developmental or neurological disorders. Often used to describe an individual who is not on the autism spectrum.
 Allistic – a person who is not autistic but may or may not be neurodivergent in other ways, for example, a dyslexic person, or someone with ADHD. Originally and commonly, however, it is used satirically to describe those without autism.

Autism spectrum disorders; DSM-V; Diagnostic criteria-Diagnostic and Statistical Manual of Mental Disorders, Fifth Edition (DSM-5) is the 2013 update to the American Psychiatric Association's (APA) classification and diagnostic tool. In the United States, the DSM serves as a universal authority for psychiatric diagnosis.

Overview

Autistic adults
Communication and social problems often cause difficulties in many areas of an autistic adult's life. A 2008 study found that adults with ASD commonly experience difficulty starting social interactions, a longing for greater intimacy, a profound sense of isolation, and effort to develop greater social or self-awareness.

A much smaller proportion of adult autistics marry than the general population. It has been hypothesized that autistic people are subject to assortative mating; they tend to pair with each other and raise autistic offspring. This hypothesis has been publicized in the popular press, but has not been empirically tested.

British psychologist Simon Baron-Cohen said that an increasingly technological society has opened up niches for people with Asperger syndrome, who may choose fields that are "highly systematised and predictable." People with AS could do well in workplace roles that are "system-centered, and connect with the nitty-gritty detail of the product or the system."

Autistic savants

An autistic savant is an autistic person with extreme talent in one or more areas of study. Although there is a common association between savant syndrome and autism (an association made popular by the 1988 film Rain Man), most autistic people are not savants and savantism is not unique to autistic people, though there does seem to be some relation. One in ten autistic people may have notable abilities, but prodigious savants like Stephen Wiltshire are very rare; only about 100 such people have been described/identified in the century since savants were first identified, and there are only about 25 living identified prodigious savants worldwide.

Gender aspects

Autistic women
Autism is thought of as a condition mostly affecting males, with males up to four times more likely than females to be diagnosed as autistic and among those with Asperger syndrome or "high-functioning autism", males are up to ten times more likely to be diagnosed. This may be due to the fact that many of the diagnostic tools used to diagnose autism have been crafted through the observation of males on the autism spectrum and are therefore more likely to identify men and boys with autism than their female counterparts. To date, the research and support surrounding autistic people has been male-centric, women and non-binary people are seriously underrepresented.

For many autistic females the lack of diagnosis or a late diagnosis results in them missing out on supports and interventions that are most valuable when implemented at a younger age. For those females who do receive a diagnosis and are provided with those supports, often have to face the many of them have been created with males in mind and may not acknowledge the physical, psychological and societal differences that females face.

Some autistic women find themselves misdiagnosed with personality disorders, such as borderline personality disorder, avoidant personality disorder and schizoid personality disorder. Autistic females are "research orphans" according to Yale's Ami Klin; some drugs used to treat anxiety or hyperactivity that may accompany autism are rarely tested on autistic females. Autism may express differently in the sexes, with many females on the spectrum presenting more subtly than males and may be more adept at developing more sophisticated social masking behaviours, as such females with more prominent difficulties are more likely to be diagnosed than those who present differently. Autistic females are more likely to develop a more sophisticated social camouflage for a variety of reasons. One theory as to why is that women as a whole face more complex social expectations than men, creating a greater need to "prepare more thoroughly for social situations, or risk ostracism".

Another theory suggests that women on the spectrum have a more inborn need for social interaction than their male counterparts, leading many women and girls to be more invested in creating social camouflage strategies. These strategies are developed in a variety of ways such as, observing and copying the social interactions of those around them as well as creating strategies to attempt to "go undetected". These coping mechanisms can take an immense amount of time and energy to learn and practice and can as Dr. Shana Nicols states "more often than not lead to exhaustion, withdrawal, anxiety, selective mutism and depression". Females may be more concerned with how they are viewed by peers and the failure to connect with people outside of their immediate family could lead to severe anxiety or clinical depression. Autistic girls who have "normal" intelligence may be more socially disadvantaged than males because of the "rising level of social interaction that comes in middle school," when girls' "friendships often hinge on attention to feelings and lots of rapid and nuanced communication."

Autistic girls may suffer additionally by being placed in specialized educational programs, where they will be surrounded by males and further isolated from female social contacts. Females on the autism spectrum often "internalize feelings of frustration and failure" and are believed to have higher rates of certain comorbidities such as anxiety and depression (36 and 34 percent respectively), due in large part to the desire for along with the difficulties in finding social inclusion along with other social and sensory challenges. Lack of diagnosis can also lead autistic females to have higher rates of depression, anxiety and self-esteem issues as they are left without a clear understanding as to why they do not "fit in" with their peers. Females on the spectrum also seem to have higher rates of eating disorders, such as anorexia, than other females. This may be related to social isolation and elevated levels of anxiety along with a need to control their environment more fully, although a complicating factor which is just being explored in the scientific literature is that functional disorders of eating and digestion such as IBS, GERD, food allergies, gastroparesis et al, as well as sensory issues common in autistic people generally, may contribute heavily to "disordered eating" behavior which is physical, sensory, allergic, or pain-related rather than psychological.

Although both males and females on the spectrum have a higher risk of experiencing bullying, these experiences often present differently based on gender. Although sample sizes are too small to draw firm conclusions, one study suggests that autistic women are less likely than males over the long term to marry, have families, go to college, have careers and live independently. An intense interest in specific topics plays a significant factor in the lives of those on the autism spectrum of both genders. Females on the spectrum may focus on different topics than their male counterparts; autistic females rarely have interests in numbers or have stores of specialized knowledge, the intense interests of autistic females can be overlooked as they are often seen to be more applicable to a broader section of society.

Both males and females with autism deal with the same core symptom, but when those symptoms are mixed with ideas of gender, they can offer very different lived experiences for females than their male counterparts. The profile of autism may change as more is understood about females, whose autism may go undiagnosed.

Gender identity and sexual orientation

In recent years (as of 2022), some people have suggested overlap between people with autism and a non-heterosexual identity (with autistic people more likely to be identified as gay, bisexual or asexual) as well as an overlap with a transgender identity. This issue has not been without controversy, as the issue is open to confusion; it is currently unclear whether this correlation exists due to any innate characteristic of autism that may also cause unusual discrepancies in sex or gender, or whether it is the result of exposing a group of people who experience difficulty in abiding by social norms, including those related to gender, to sexism and gender stereotypes.

Relationships with animals

Temple Grandin, autistic designer of cattle handling systems, said that one reason she can easily figure out how a cow would react is because autistic people can easily "think the way that animals think." According to Grandin, animals do not have "complex emotions such as shame or guilt" and they do not think in language. She says that, although not everything about animals is like an autistic person, the similarity is that they think visually and without language. She says people do not make this connection because the study of autism and the study of animal behavior are parallel disciplines involving different individuals. Despite these similarities, the degree to which autistic individuals can be said to think like animals remains undetermined; non-human animals, as well as humans, have evolved cognitive specializations that may or may not share characteristics with other species.

Dawn Prince-Hughes, diagnosed with Asperger's, describes her observations of gorillas in Songs of the Gorilla Nation.

Asperger syndrome and interpersonal relationships
Individuals with Asperger syndrome (AS) may develop problems in their abilities to engage successfully in interpersonal relationships.

Social impact
Asperger syndrome may lead to problems in social interaction with peers. These problems can be severe or mild depending on the individual. People with AS are often the target of bullying behavior. Children with AS are often the target of bullying at school due to their idiosyncratic behavior, precise language, unusual interests, and impaired ability to perceive and respond in socially expected ways to nonverbal cues, particularly in interpersonal conflict, which results in them being sought out by classmates and rejected. People with AS may be overly literal and may have difficulty interpreting and responding to sarcasm, banter, or metaphorical speech. Difficulties with social interaction may also manifest in a lack of play with other children.

The above problems can even arise in the family; given an unfavorable family environment, the child may be subject to emotional abuse. A child, teen, or adult with AS is often puzzled by this mistreatment, unaware of what has been done incorrectly. Unlike with other pervasive development disorders, most persons with AS want to be social, but fail to socialize successfully, which can lead to later withdrawal and asocial behavior, especially in adolescence. At this stage of life especially, they risk being drawn into unsuitable and inappropriate friendships and social groups. People with AS often interact better with those considerably older or younger than themselves, rather than those within their own age group.

Children with AS often display advanced abilities for their age in language, reading, mathematics, spatial skills, or music—sometimes into the "gifted" range—but this may be counterbalanced by considerable delays in other developmental areas, like verbal and nonverbal communication or some lack of motor coordination. This combination of traits can lead to problems with teachers and other authority figures. A child with AS might be regarded by teachers as a "problem child" or a "poor performer". The child's extremely low tolerance for what they perceive to be ordinary and mundane tasks, such as typical homework assignments, can easily become frustrating; a teacher may well consider the child arrogant, spiteful, and insubordinate. Lack of support and understanding, in combination with the child's anxieties, can result in problematic behavior (such as severe tantrums, violent and angry outbursts, and withdrawal).

Employment for those with AS may be difficult. The impaired social skills can be likely to interfere with the interview process—and people with often superior skills can be passed over due to these conflicts with interviewers. Once hired, people with AS may continue to have difficulty with interpersonal communications. Homelessness is very common among people with AS.

While some researchers have suggested that autistic individuals are less likely to self-enhance their reputation compared to those without autism, others argue that autistic individuals do not have less of a desire for self-enhancement than non-autistic individuals.

Difficulties in relationships
Two traits sometimes found in AS individuals are mind-blindness (the inability to predict the beliefs and intentions of others) and alexithymia (the inability to identify and interpret emotional signals in oneself or others), which reduce the ability to be empathetically attuned to others. Alexithymia in AS functions as an independent variable relying on different neural networks than those implicated in theory of mind (ToM). In fact, a lack of ToM in AS may be a result of a lack of information available to the mind due to the operation of the alexithymic deficit.

A second issue related to alexithymia involves the inability to identify and modulate strong emotions such as sadness or anger, which leaves the individual prone to "sudden affective outbursts such as crying or rage". According to Tony Attwood, the inability to express feelings using words may also predispose the individual to use physical acts to articulate the mood and release the emotional energy.

People with AS report a feeling of being detached against their will from the world around them ("on the outside looking in"). They may have difficulty finding a life partner or getting married due to poor social skills. The complexity and inconsistency of the social world can pose an extreme challenge for individuals with AS. In the UK Asperger's is covered by the Disability Discrimination Act; those with AS who get treated badly because of it may have some redress. The first case was Hewett v Motorola 2004 (sometimes referred to as Hewitt) and the second was Isles v Ealing Council. The same applies in the United States with the Americans with Disabilities Act, amended in 2008 to include autism spectrum disorders.
 
The intense focus and tendency to work things out logically often grants people with AS a high level of ability in their field of interest. When these special interests coincide with a materially or socially useful task, the person with AS can lead a profitable career and a fulfilled life. The child obsessed with a specific area may succeed in employment related to that area.

According to Elizabeth Fein, the dynamic of role-playing games is especially positive and attractive to people on the autism spectrum. The social information exchanged in these games are explicit, top-down and systematic and they follow a set of shared abstract rules. Baez and Rattazzi showed that interpreting the implicit social information of daily life is difficult for autistics.

Despite the fact that AS individuals are commonly known to lack ToM, recent research has suggested that ToM may be not only present in AS individuals but also act differently compared to neurotypicals as suggested in the double empathy problem. Autistic ToM is simply based on the use of rules and logic. It is also suggested that people on the autism spectrum can understand and predict the thoughts and motivations of each other better than neurotypicals can, and autistic interactions may display even greater social signals of shared enjoyment, ease, and rapport when interacting. This means AS individuals present mind-blindness and alexithymia towards neurotypicals and vice versa due to bidirectional differences in communication style as well as a reciprocal lack of understanding since the two neurotypes clash.

Autism rights movement

The autism rights movement is a social movement within the context of disability rights that emphasizes the concept of neurodiversity, viewing the autism spectrum as a result of natural variations in the human brain rather than a disorder to be cured. The ARM advocates a variety of goals, including greater acceptance of autistic behaviors; therapies that focus on coping skills rather than imitating the behaviors of neurotypical peers; the creation of social networks and events that allow autistic people to socialize on their own terms; and the recognition of the autistic community as a minority group.

Autism rights or neurodiversity advocates believe that the autism spectrum is genetic and should be accepted as a natural expression of the human genome. This perspective is distinct from two other likewise distinct views: the medical perspective, that autism is caused by a genetic defect and should be addressed by targeting the autism gene(s), and the fringe theory that autism is caused by environmental factors like vaccines and pollution and could be cured by addressing environmental causes.

The movement is controversial. There are a wide variety of both supportive and critical opinions about the movement among people who are autistic or associated with autistic people. A common criticism leveled against autistic activists is that the majority of them are "high-functioning" or have Asperger syndrome and do not represent the views of "low-functioning" autistic people.

Autistic pride

Autistic pride refers to pride in autism and shifting views of autism from "disease" to "difference." Autistic pride emphasizes the innate potential in all human phenotypic expressions and celebrates the diversity various neurological types express.

Autistic pride asserts that autistic people are not impaired or damaged; rather, they have a unique set of characteristics that provide them many rewards and challenges, not unlike their non-autistic peers.

Curing autism is a controversial and politicized issue. The "autistic community" can be divided into several groups. Some seek a cure for autism—sometimes dubbed as pro-cure—while others consider a cure unnecessary or unethical, or feel that autism conditions are not harmful or detrimental. For example, it may be seen as an evolutionary adaptation to an ecological niche by some environmentalists and the more radical autism rights campaigners.

Autistic culture and community

With the recent increases in autism recognition and new approaches to educating and socializing autistics, an autistic culture has begun to develop. Autistic culture is based on a belief that autism is a unique way of being and not a disorder to be cured. The Aspie world, as it is sometimes called, contains people with Asperger syndrome (AS) and high functioning autism (HFA), and can be linked to three historical trends: the emergence of AS and HFA as labels, the emergence of the disability rights movement, and the rise of the Internet. Autistic communities exist both online and offline; many people use these for support and communication with others like themselves, as the social limitations of autism sometimes make it difficult to make friends, to establish support within general society, and to construct an identity within society.

Because many autistics find it easier to communicate online than in person, a large number of online resources are available. Some autistic individuals learn sign language, participate in online chat rooms, discussion boards, and websites, or use communication devices at autism-community social events such as Autreat. The Internet helps bypass non-verbal cues and emotional sharing that some autistics tend to have difficulty with. It gives autistic individuals a way to communicate and form online communities.

Conducting work, conversation and interviews online in chat rooms, rather than via phone calls or personal contact, help level the playing field for many autistics. A New York Times article said "the impact of the Internet on autistics may one day be compared in magnitude to the spread of sign language among the deaf" because it opens new opportunities for communication by filtering out "sensory overload that impedes communication among autistics."

Globally 

Autistic people may be perceived differently from country to country. For example, many Africans have spiritual beliefs about psychiatric disorders, which extends into perceived causes of autism. In one survey of Nigerian pediatric or psychiatric nurses, 40% cited preternatural causes of autism such as ancestral spirits or the action of the devil.

Events and public recognition

World Autism Day

World Autism Day, also called World Autism Awareness Day, is marked on 2 April. It was designated by the United Nations General Assembly at the end of 2007. On 2 April 2009, activists left 150 strollers near Central Park in New York City to raise awareness that one in 150 children is estimated to be autistic.
There are many celebration activities all over the world on 2 April—World Autism Day. "Autism knows no geographic boundaries—it affects individuals and families on every continent and in every country," said Suzanne Wright, co-founder of the group Autism Speaks. "The celebration of World Autism Awareness Day is an important way to help the world better understand the scope of this health crisis and the need for compassion and acceptance for those living with autism. This remarkable day—the first of many to come—promises to be a time of great hope and happiness as we work to build a global autism community."

Light It Up Blue
In 2010, Autism Speaks launched the Light It Up Blue initiative. Light It Up Blue sees prominent buildings across the world—including the Empire State Building in New York City and the CN Tower in Toronto, Ontario, Canada—turn their lights blue to raise awareness for autism and to commemorate World Autism Awareness Day. However, the Autism Speaks group is not well received by most autism rights activists, due to their lack of incorporation of perspectives of actual autistic people in their work, and their focus on searching for a 'cure'.

Autism Sunday

Autism Sunday is a global Christian event, observed on the second Sunday of February. It is supported by church leaders and organisations around the world. The event started as a small idea in the front room of British autism campaigners, Ivan and Charika Corea. It is now a huge event celebrated in many countries. Autism Sunday was launched in London in 2002 with a historic service at St. Paul's Cathedral.

Autism Awareness Year

The year 2002 was declared Autism Awareness Year in the United Kingdom—this idea was initiated by Ivan and Charika Corea, parents of an autistic child, Charin. Autism Awareness Year was led by the British Institute of Brain Injured Children, Disabilities Trust, The Shirley Foundation, National Autistic Society, Autism London and 800 organizations in the United Kingdom. It had the personal backing of British Prime Minister Tony Blair. This was the first ever occasion of partnership working on autism on such a huge scale. 2002 Autism Awareness Year helped raise awareness of the serious issues concerning autism and Asperger's Syndrome across the United Kingdom. A major conference, Autism 2002 was held at the King's Fund in London with debates in the House of Commons and the House of Lords in Westminster. Autism awareness ribbons were worn to mark the year.

British autism advocates want autistic people acknowledged as a minority rather than as disabled, because they say that "disability discrimination laws don't protect those who are not disabled but who 'still have something that makes them look or act differently from other people.'" But the autism community is split over this issue, and some view this notion as radical.

Autistic Pride Day 

Autistic Pride Day is an Aspies For Freedom initiative celebrated on 18 June each year. It is a day for celebrating the neurodiversity of autistic people. Modeled after gay pride events, they often compare their efforts to the civil rights and LGBT social movements.

Autistics Speaking Day 
Autistics Speaking Day (ASDay), 1 November, is a self-advocacy campaign run by autistic people to raise awareness and challenge negative stereotypes about autism by speaking for themselves and sharing their stories. The first one was held in 2010. According to one of the founders, Corina Becker, the main goal of ASDay is "to acknowledge our difficulties while sharing our strengths, passions, and interests." The idea for the event developed out of opposition to a "Communication Shutdown" fundraising campaign led by Autism Speaks that year, which had asked for participants to "simulate" having autism by staying away from all forms of online communication for one day.

Autism Acceptance Project 
In 2006 the Autism Acceptance Project was founded by Estée Klar, the mother of an autistic child, with help from an autistic advisory and board. The project's mission statement is, "The Autism Acceptance Project is dedicated to promoting acceptance of and accommodations for autistic people in society." The project is primarily supported by autistic people and their supporters. The goal is to create a positive perspective of autism and to accept autism as a part of life with its trials and tribulations. The project is also working to enable autistic people to gain the right to advocate for themselves (along with their supporters) in all policy decision formats from government to a general committee. By providing an abundance of resources, the project is able to reach a multitude of audiences using a Web site along with lectures and exhibitions.

Autism Acceptance Day 
In 2011, the first Autism Acceptance Day celebrations were organized by Paula Durbin Westby, as a response to traditional "Autism Awareness" campaigns which the Autistic community found harmful and insufficient. Autism Acceptance Day is now held every April. "Awareness" focuses on informing others of the existence of autism while "acceptance" pushes towards validating and honoring the autism community. By providing tools and educational material, people are encouraged to embrace the challenges autistic people face and celebrate their strengths. Rather than making autism into a crippling disability, acceptance integrates those on the autistic spectrum into everyday society. Instead of encouraging people to wear blue as Autism Awareness Day does, Autism Acceptance Day encourages people to wear red.

Autreat 
At Autreat—an annual autistic gathering—participants compared their movement to gay rights activists, or the Deaf culture, where sign language is preferred over surgery that might restore hearing. Other local organizations have also arisen: for example, a European counterpart, Autscape, was created around 2005.

Twainbow 
Twainbow is an advocacy organization that provides awareness, education, and support for autistic people who identify as lesbian/gay/bisexual/transgender (LGBT). According to its founder, "Twainbow is a portmanteau of 'twain' (meaning 'two') and 'rainbow.' Those who are both LGBT and autistic live under two rainbows—the rainbow flag and the autism spectrum." The company also introduced an LGBT-autism Gay Pride flag representing the population.

History 
Donald Triplett was the first person diagnosed with autism. He was diagnosed by Kanner after being first examined in 1938, and was labeled as "case 1". Triplett was noted for his savant abilities, particularly being able to name musical notes played on a piano and to mentally multiply numbers. His father, Oliver, described him as socially withdrawn but interested in number patterns, music notes, letters of the alphabet, and U.S. president pictures. By the age of two, he had the ability to recite the 23rd Psalm and memorized 25 questions and answers from the Presbyterian catechism. He was also interested in creating musical chords.

Scholarship
Autism spectrum disorders received increasing attention from social-science scholars in the early 2000s, with the goals of improving support services and therapies, arguing that autism should be tolerated as a difference not a disorder, and by how autism affects the definition of personhood and identity. Sociological research has also investigated how social institutions, particularly families, cope with the challenges associated with autism.

Media portrayals 

Much of the public perception of autism is based on its portrayals in biographies, movies, novels, and TV series. Many of these portrayals have been inaccurate, and have contributed to a divergence between public perception and the clinical reality of autism. For example, in the movie Mozart and the Whale (2005), the opening scene gives four clues that a leading character has Asperger syndrome, and two of these clues are extraordinary savant skills. The savant skills are not needed in the film, but in the movies savant skills have become a stereotype for the autism spectrum, because of the incorrect assertion that most autistic people are savants.

Some works from the 1970s have autistic characters, who are rarely labeled. In contrast, in the BBC2 television miniseries The Politician's Husband (2013), the impact of Noah Hoynes' Aspergers on the boy's behavior and on his family, and steps Noah's loved ones take to accommodate and address it, are prominent plot points in all three episodes.

Popular media have depicted special talents of some autistic people, including exceptional abilities as seen in the 1988 movie Rain Man. Such portrayals have been criticized by both scientific studies and media analysts over the years for fostering a pigeonholing image of autism that leads to false expectations about real-life autistic individuals, with Rain Man being singled out for popularizing it.

Since the 1970s, fictional portrayals of autistic people, Asperger syndrome, and other ASCs have become more frequent. Public perception of autism is often based on these fictional portrayals in novels, biographies, movies, and TV series. These depictions of autism in media today are often made in a way that brings pity to the public and their concern of the topic, because their viewpoint is never actually shown, leaving the public without knowledge of autism and its diagnosis. Portrayals in the media of characters with atypical abilities (for example, the ability to multiply large numbers without a calculator) may be misinterpreted by viewers as accurate portrayals of all autistic people and of autism itself. Additionally, the media frequently depicts autism as only affecting children, which promotes the misconception that autism does not affect adults.

Notable individuals

Some notable figures like American food animal handling systems designer and author Temple Grandin, American Pulitzer Prize-winning music critic and author Tim Page, Australian musician, lead singer and only constant member of rock band the Vines Craig Nicholls, English actor and filmmaker Paddy Considine and Swedish environmental activist Greta Thunberg are autistic.

Thunberg, who in August 2018 started the "School strike for climate" movement, has explained how the "gift" of living with Asperger syndrome helps her "see things from outside the box" when it comes to climate change. In an interview with presenter Nick Robinson on BBC Radio 4's Today, the then-16-year-old activist said that autism helps her see things in "black and white". She went on to say:

Scottish singer Susan Boyle was diagnosed with Aspergers at the age of 51. Boyle was originally believed to have had slight brain damage at birth. Boyle rose to fame after appearing on the talent show Britain's Got Talent in 2009. Her debut album I Dreamed a Dream, released in 2009, became the fastest selling debut by a UK artist of all time. American actress Daryl Hannah, star of movies such as Splash, Steel Magnolias and Wall Street, was diagnosed as being on the autism spectrum as a child. Diagnosed at fifteen, Heather Kuzmich appeared on America's Next Top Model in 2007. Although she did not win the competition, Kuzmich was voted the viewers' favourite eight weeks in a row. She has since been signed to Elite Model Management. New Zealand-born musician Ladyhawke and gold medal-winning British Paralympic swimmer Jessica-Jane Applegate are also autistic. In June 2021, autistic Scottish strongman Tom Stoltman won the World's Strongest Man competition. Welsh actor Anthony Hopkins is the first openly autistic actor to win an Academy Award.

Additionally, media speculation of contemporary figures as being on the autism spectrum has become popular in recent times. New York magazine reported some examples, which included that Time magazine suggested that Bill Gates is autistic, and that a biographer of Warren Buffett wrote that his prodigious memory and "fascination with numbers" give him "a vaguely autistic aura." The magazine also reported that on Celebrity Rehab, Dr. Drew Pinsky deemed basketball player Dennis Rodman a candidate for an Asperger's diagnosis, and the UCLA specialist consulted "seemed to concur". Nora Ephron criticized these conclusions, writing that popular speculative diagnoses suggest autism is "an epidemic, or else a wildly over-diagnosed thing that there used to be other words for." The practice of diagnosing autism in these cases is controversial.

Some historical personalities are also the subject of speculation about being autistic, e.g. Michelangelo.

See also
 Autism-friendly
 Autism spectrum disorders in the media
 Autism: The Musical
 Autistic art
Look Me in the Eye, a New York Times bestseller
 Love on the Spectrum
 Social model of disability

References

Further reading
 Julia Bascom (editor). Loud Hands: Autistic People, Speaking. Washington, DC: Autistic Self Advocacy Network, 2012. 
 
 Temple Grandin. Thinking in Pictures, Expanded Edition: My Life with Autism, New York, New York: Vintage, 2011.

External links
 John Elder Robison radio interview about life with Asperger's Syndrome
Asperger's Syndrome, on Screen and in Life, The New York Times, 3 August 2009
This Podcast Has Autism , a podcast showcasing Autistics and their achievements